Brînzenii Noi is a commune in Telenești District, Moldova. It is composed of two villages, Brînzenii Noi and Brînzenii Vechi.

Notable people 
 Ion Buzdugan
 Pavel Parasca

References

Communes of Telenești District